Society was an 1865 comedy drama by Thomas William Robertson regarded as a milestone in Victorian drama because of its realism in sets, costume, acting and dialogue. Unusually for that time, Robertson both wrote and directed the play, and his innovative writing and stage direction inspired George Bernard Shaw and W. S. Gilbert.

Origins
The play originally ran at the Prince of Wales's Theatre, Liverpool, under the management of Mr A. Henderson, opening on 8 May 1865. It was recommended to Effie Wilton, the manager of the Prince of Wales's Theatre in London's West End, by H. J. Byron, where it ran from 11 November 1865 to 4 May 1866 Robertson found fame with his new comedy, which included a scene that fictionalized the Fun gang, who frequented the Arundel Club, the Savage Club, and especially Evans's café, where they had a table in competition with the Punch 'Round table'. The play marked the London debut of Squire Bancroft, who went on to marry Effie Wilton in 1867 and become her co-manager.

Society had been rejected by many theatrical managers before finally being produced at the Prince of Wales's Theatre. Together, Robertson and the Bancrofts are considered to have instigated a new form of drama known as 'drawing-room comedy' or 'cup and saucer drama', so-named because real cups and saucers were used as props. The Bancrofts
gave Robertson an unprecedented amount of directorial control over his plays, which was a key step to institutionalising the power that directors wield in the theatre today.

Success
The comedy was such a success that another row of stalls had to be added, and the Prince of Wales came to see the play. In Society, Robertson made a distinct attempt to introduce naturalism into contemporary drama. In his play, Robertson looked at the world around him and tried to reproduce it realistically through drama. The characters act like people of their day. Society was so popular that it encouraged Robertson to go further along the same realistic path in a series of plays: Ours (1866), Caste (1867), Play (1868), School (1869), and M.P. (1870). These plays, together with Society, inspired playwrights such as W. S. Gilbert and George Bernard Shaw. Robertson directed his own plays, which was a radical change from the usual system in Victorian theatre of the manager of the theatre company staging the work around its star player. Gilbert said of this innovation: "I frequently attended his rehearsals and learnt a great deal from his method of stage-management, which in those days was quite a novelty, although most pieces are now stage-managed on the principles he introduced. I look upon stage-management, as now understood, as having been absolutely invented by him."

It was in Society that the originality and cleverness of the dramatist were fully recognised. Play-writer and company were exactly suited one to another; the plays and the acting together – the small size of the playhouse being also in their favour – were at once recognised as a new thing. Although some critics sneered at the "cup-and-saucer comedy", others voted it absurdly realistic, and said there was nothing in it but commonplace life represented without a trace of Sheridanian wit and sparkle. Nevertheless, playgoers flocked to the little theatre in Tottenham Court Road, and the London stage was at once inundated with imitations of the new style of acting and the new kind of play.

Miss Marie Wilton, the darling of the Strand Theatre, and the life and soul of the merry and really witty burlesques (what a contrast to the vapid 'musical comedies' of to-day!) that then formed the staple fare at that popular little playhouse, was anxious to spread her wings and try her strength in comedy. With that object in view she had taken the old Prince of Wales Theatre, hard by Tottenham Court Road, a place of amusement that had fallen into such disrepute that it was sneeringly nicknamed "The Dust-bin" ... So different in treatment was it from the plays with which theatre-goers were then apparently well pleased that Miss Wilton's friends and admirers frankly warned her that introduction was "dangerous."

The supposed danger lay in the simplicity of the play. True to nature it might be, but audiences accustomed to theatrical types verging on the border-land of caricature would (so managers thought) be hardly likely to accept a mere photograph of human life. It was the old tale of actors' portraits "Penny plain and tuppence coloured." The coloured articles had the readiest sale in the shops, ergo they could not be made too florid in the theatres. Miss Wilton, however, having in common with Sothern estimated Society at its true worth, declared that danger was better than dullness, selected her supporters, and under the now delighted author's superintendence, commenced rehearsals. After some preliminary difficulties it was produced, first in Liverpool and then in London.

Having been very favourably received in the Lancashire city, Society was produced in the metropolis on November 11, 1865, and on the following day Robertson awoke to find himself famous. The success of the piece
was, indeed, instantaneous, and soon became the talk of the town. Not to have seen Marie Wilton as Maud
Hetherington, Bancroft as Sidney Daryl, John Hare as Lord Ptarmigant, John Clarke as John Chodd, junior, Fred Dewar as Tom Stylus, and Sophie Larkin as Lady Ptarmigant, was to argue yourself unknown and so at
one and the same moment the fortunes of a luckless theatre and a hitherto misunderstood dramatist were made.

How much of this success was due to Robertson may be told in Mr. Bancroft's own words: "As the part I first 
played in Society," he says, "was a very important one to intrust to so young an actor as I then was, bearing as it does much of the burden of the play, I should like to note how much of the success I was fortunate enough to achieve was due to the encouragement and support I received from the author, who spared no pains with me, as with the others, to have his somewhat novel type of characters understood and acted as he wished." 

He might have added but perhaps he hardly realised it that the triumph of the whole play owed much to 
the tact and the liberality of the clever lady who allowed Robertson to have his own way with the stage-management and (as far as was then possible) with the mounting of his work."

Robertson's  original manuscript of Society was donated to the Shakespeare Memorial Library at Stratford-upon-Avon.

Original cast
Maud Hetherington – Effie Wilton
Sidney Daryl – Squire Bancroft
Lord Ptarmigant – John Hare
John Chodd, Jnr – John Clarke
Tom Stylus – Fred Dewar
Lady Ptarmigant – Sophie Larkin

References

External links
Full text of Society and Caste edited by T. Edgar Pemberton (1905)

1865 plays
Plays by Thomas William Robertson